Vasyukov is a Russian masculine surname, its feminine counterpart is Vasyukova. Notable people with the surname include:

Kostyantyn Vasyukov (born 1981), Ukrainian sprinter
Olga Vasyukova (born 1980), Russian synchronized swimmer

Russian-language surnames